Lesley Cohen (born December 22, 1970) is a Democratic member of the Nevada Assembly, serving since 2016 (and previously from 2013 until 2014). The Clark County Commission appointed 
Cohen to the Assembly after the resignation of April Mastroluca following the 2012 general election.  Republican Stephen Silberkraus defeated Cohen in the 2014 general election by more than 1,300 votes   but she retook the seat in the 2016 election by 212 votes.  Cohen is also a divorce attorney.

References

External links
 

Democratic Party members of the Nevada Assembly
People from the Las Vegas Valley
1970 births
Living people
21st-century American politicians